The Bihar football team is an Indian football team representing Bihar in Indian state football competitions including the Santosh Trophy. They have failed to qualify for the final rounds of most Santosh Trophy editions.

Current squad

Honours
National Games
 Bronze medal (1): 1987

 B.C. Roy Trophy
 Winners (2): 1996–97, 2000–01

 Mir Iqbal Hussain Trophy
 Winners (4): 1995–96, 1996–97, 1997–98, 2001–02
 Runners-up (1): 1998–99

References

Bihar
Football in Bihar
Year of establishment missing